Thomas Makris (born 12 August 1978) is a retired Greek football striker.

Career
After playing regional league football with Iraklis Larissa, Makris began his professional football career with Xanthi F.C. He was loaned to Egaleo F.C. during 1999, the club where he would enjoy his greatest successes including winning the 2000–01 Beta Ethniki while he led the league in goal-scoring and playing in the 2004–05 UEFA Cup.

References

1978 births
Living people
Greek footballers
Xanthi F.C. players
Egaleo F.C. players
Chalkidona F.C. players
Ilisiakos F.C. players
Ethnikos Asteras F.C. players
Agios Dimitrios F.C. players
Chaidari F.C. players
Doxa Vyronas F.C. players
Super League Greece players
Association football forwards
Footballers from Larissa